Zodiac is an unincorporated area in Vernon County, Missouri, United States. The community was located in the southeast corner of Vernon County at the head of a small tributary to the west side of Horse Creek at an elevation of 942 feet.

History
Zodiac was platted in 1881. The community took its name from nearby Zodiac Springs. A post office was established at Zodiac in 1882, and remained in operation until it was discontinued in 1914.

References

Unincorporated communities in Vernon County, Missouri
Unincorporated communities in Missouri